Pleurotomella chapplei is an extinct species of sea snail, a marine gastropod mollusk in the family Raphitomidae.

Description

Distribution
Fossils of this marine species were found off Victoria, Australia

References

External links
 Beu, A.G. 2011 Marine Molluscs of oxygen isotope stages of the last 2 million years in New Zealand. Part 4. Gastropoda (Ptenoglossa, Neogastropoda, Heterobranchia). Journal of the Royal Society of New Zealand 41, 1–153

chapplei
Gastropods described in 1944
Gastropods of Australia